Rabun County High School is a public high school operated by the Rabun County School District. It is located on the edge of Tiger, a town in Rabun County in the U.S. state of Georgia. It is the original venue of Foxfire magazine and related projects.

Notable alumni

 Charlie Woerner: current San Francisco 49ers tight end and former University of Georgia tight end

See also
Rabun Gap-Nacoochee School
Foxfire (magazine)

External links 
Rabun Co. H.S. home page

Public high schools in Georgia (U.S. state)
Schools in Rabun County, Georgia